Ulmus bergmanniana C.K.Schneid., commonly known as Bergmann's elm, is a deciduous tree found across much of China in forests at elevations of 1500–3000 m.

Description
The bark is longitudinally fissured, and varies in colour from greyish-white to dark grey. The perfect, wind-pollinated apetalous flowers are produced on second-year shoots in February, followed by generally obovate samarae <30 mm long by 14 mm width, the centre of the seed about 7 mm from the slightly notched apex. Branchlets do not possess the corky wings characteristic of many other elm species.

Pests and diseases
U. bergmanniana has a moderate resistance to Dutch elm disease; in trials  in Oklahoma it was also found to be eschewed by the elm leaf beetle Xanthogaleruca luteola , but further north at the Morton Arboretum was moderately to highly preferred by the insect. The species is also susceptible to the elm leafminer.

Cultivation
The tree was introduced to the West in 1900. In trials in the USA it was found to propagate well, and also proved to be very winter hardy. The tree was one of 12 Chinese species under evaluation at the Morton Arboretum, Illinois, in 2009 by the late Dr George Ware. There are no known cultivars of this taxon.

Subspecies & varieties
Two varieties are recognized: var. bergmanniana L.K.Fu, and var. lasiophylla C.K.Schneid..

Etymology
The species was named by Camillo Karl Schneider for his friend Carl Bergmann, who assisted in indexing the work in which it was published.

Accessions
North America
Brenton Arboretum, US.
Chicago Botanic Garden, US. Planted in West Collections Area.
Denver Botanic Gardens, US. No acc. no. available.
Morton Arboretum, US. acc. no. 44-95. Obtained from Yunnan Province, China.
United States National Arboretum, Washington, D.C., US. Acc. nos. 68997, 76216, 76217, 76242, 68977.

Europe
Grange Farm Arboretum, Lincolnshire, UK. Acc. no. 507
Wijdemeren City Council, Netherlands. Elm collection. Planted 2013 Smeerdijkgaarde, Kortenhoef.

Nurseries
Europe
Pan-Global Plants , Frampton-on-Severn, Gloucestershire, UK.

References

External links

Elm species and varieties
Trees of China
Flora of China
Trees of Asia
Ulmus articles with images
bergmanniana